Rituximab, sold under the brand name Rituxan among others, is a monoclonal antibody medication used to treat certain autoimmune diseases and types of cancer. It is used for non-Hodgkin lymphoma, chronic lymphocytic leukemia (in non-geriatric patients), rheumatoid arthritis, granulomatosis with polyangiitis, idiopathic thrombocytopenic purpura, pemphigus vulgaris, myasthenia gravis and Epstein–Barr virus-positive mucocutaneous ulcers. It is given by slow injection into a vein. Biosimilars of Rituxan include Blitzima, Riabni, Ritemvia, Rituenza (F.K.A. Tuxella), Rixathon, Ruxience, and Truxima.

Common side effects which often occur within two hours of the medication being given include rash, itchiness, low blood pressure, and shortness of breath. Infections are also common.

Severe side effects include reactivation of hepatitis B in those previously infected, progressive multifocal leukoencephalopathy, toxic epidermal necrolysis, and death. It is unclear if use during pregnancy is safe for the developing fetus or newborn baby, but it is not proven harmful.

Rituximab is a chimeric monoclonal antibody against the protein CD20, which is primarily found on the surface of immune system B cells. When it binds to this protein it triggers cell death.

Rituximab was approved for medical use in 1997. It is on the World Health Organization's List of Essential Medicines. Rituximab is co-marketed by Biogen and Genentech in the U.S., by Hoffmann-La Roche in Canada and the European Union, Chugai Pharmaceuticals, Zenyaku Kogyo in Japan and AryoGen in Iran.

Medical uses 

Rituximab is a chimeric monoclonal antibody targeted against CD20 which is a surface antigen present on B cells. Therefore, it acts by depleting normal as well as pathogenic B cells while sparing plasma cells and hematopoietic stem cells as they do not express the CD20 surface antigen.

In the United States, rituximab is indicated to treat:

 non-Hodgkin lymphoma (NHL)
 chronic lymphocytic leukemia (CLL)
 rheumatoid arthritis having inadequate response to one or more TNF inhibitors
 vasculitis such as granulomatosis with polyangiitis and microscopic polyangiitis
 moderate to severe pemphigus vulgaris
 in combination with chemotherapy for children (≥6 months to <18 years) with previously untreated, advanced stage, CD20-positive diffuse large B-cell lymphoma (DLBCL), Burkitt lymphoma (BL), Burkitt-like lymphoma (BLL), or mature B-cell acute leukemia (B-AL).

Blood cancers 
Rituximab is used to treat cancers of the white blood system such as leukemias and lymphomas, including non-Hodgkin's lymphoma, chronic lymphocytic leukemia, and nodular lymphocyte predominant Hodgkin's lymphoma. This also includes Waldenström's macroglobulinemia, a type of NHL. Rituximab in combination with hyaluronidase human, sold under the brand names MabThera SC and Rituxan Hycela, is used to treat follicular lymphoma, diffuse large B-cell lymphoma, and chronic lymphocytic leukemia. It is used in combination with fludarabine and cyclophosphamide to treat previously untreated and previously treated CD20-positive chronic lymphocytic leukemia.

Autoimmune diseases 

Rituximab has been shown to be an effective rheumatoid arthritis treatment in three randomised controlled trials and is now licensed for use in refractory rheumatoid disease. In the United States, it has been FDA-approved for use in combination with methotrexate (MTX) for reducing signs and symptoms in adult patients with moderately to severely active rheumatoid arthritis (RA) who have had an inadequate response to one or more anti-TNF-alpha therapy. In the European Union, the license is slightly more restrictive: it is licensed for use in combination with MTX in patients with severe active RA who have had an inadequate response to one or more anti-TNF therapy.

There is some evidence for efficacy, but not necessarily safety, in a range of other autoimmune diseases, and rituximab is widely used off-label to treat difficult cases of multiple sclerosis, systemic lupus erythematosus, chronic inflammatory demyelinating polyneuropathy and autoimmune anemias. The most dangerous, although among the most rare, side effect is progressive multifocal leukoencephalopathy (PML) infection, which is usually fatal; however only a very small number of cases have been recorded occurring in autoimmune diseases.

Other autoimmune diseases that have been treated with rituximab include autoimmune hemolytic anemia, pure red cell aplasia, thrombotic thrombocytopenic purpura (TTP), idiopathic thrombocytopenic purpura (ITP), Evans syndrome, vasculitis (e.g., granulomatosis with polyangiitis), bullous skin disorders (for example pemphigus, pemphigoid—with very encouraging results of approximately 85% rapid recovery in pemphigus, according to a 2006 study), type 1 diabetes mellitus, Sjögren syndrome, anti-NMDA receptor encephalitis and Devic's disease, Graves' ophthalmopathy, autoimmune pancreatitis, Opsoclonus myoclonus syndrome (OMS), and IgG4-related disease. There is some evidence that it is ineffective in treating IgA-mediated autoimmune diseases.

Adverse events 

Serious adverse events, which can cause death and disability, include:

 Severe infusion reaction
 Cardiac arrest
 Cytokine release syndrome
 Tumor lysis syndrome, causing acute kidney injury
 Infections
 Progressive multifocal leukoencephalopathy (PML) caused by JC virus reactivation
Hepatitis B reactivation
 Other viral infections
 Immune toxicity, with depletion of B cells in 70% to 80% of lymphoma patients
 Pulmonary toxicity
 Bowel obstruction and perforation

Two patients with systemic lupus erythematosus died of progressive multifocal leukoencephalopathy (PML) after being treated with rituximab. PML is caused by activation of JC virus, a common virus in the brain which is usually latent. Reactivation of the JC virus usually results in death or severe brain damage.

At least one patient with rheumatoid arthritis developed PML after treatment with rituximab.

Rituximab has been reported as a possible cofactor in a chronic hepatitis E infection in a person with lymphoma. Hepatitis E infection is normally an acute infection, suggesting the drug in combination with lymphoma may have weakened the body's immune response to the virus.

A major concern with continuous rituximab treatment is the difficulty to induce a proper vaccine response. This was brought into focus during the COVID-19 pandemic, where persons with multiple sclerosis and rituximab treatment had higher risk of severe COVID-19. In persons with rituximab treatment for multiple sclerosis, 9 of 10 patients with B cell counts of 40/µL or more developed protective levels of antibodies after vaccination with tozinameran.

Mechanisms of action 

The antibody binds to the cell surface protein CD20. CD20 is widely expressed on B cells, from early pre-B cells to later in differentiation, but it is absent on terminally differentiated plasma cells. Although the function of CD20 is unknown, it may play a role in Ca2+ influx across plasma membranes, maintaining intracellular Ca2+ concentration and allowing activation of B cells.

Rituximab is relatively ineffective in elimination of cells with low CD20 cell-surface levels. It tends to stick to one side of B cells, where CD20 is, forming a cap and drawing proteins over to that side. The presence of the cap changes the effectiveness of natural killer (NK) cells in destroying these B cells. When an NK cell latched onto the cap, it had an 80% success rate at killing the cell. In contrast, when the B cell lacked this asymmetric protein cluster, it was killed only 40% of the time.

The following effects have been found:

 The Fc portion of rituximab mediates antibody-dependent cellular cytotoxicity (ADCC) and complement-dependent cytotoxicity (CDC).
 Rituximab has a general regulatory effect on the cell cycle.
 Preferential elimination of malignant B cells with high CD20 levels and high BCR signaling propensity, especially in chronic lymphocytic leukemia (CLL).
 It increases MHC II and adhesion molecules LFA-1 and LFA-3 (lymphocyte function-associated antigen).
 It elicits shedding of CD23.
 It downregulates the B cell receptor.
 It induces apoptosis of CD20+ cells.
 Rituximab also induces a release of some chronic lymphocytic leukemia cells from immune niches, which might make them more sensitive to chemotherapy used in combination with an anti-CD20 antibody.

The combined effect results in the elimination of B cells (including the cancerous ones) from the body, allowing a new population of healthy B cells to develop from lymphoid stem cells.

Rituximab binds to amino acids 170–173 and 182–185 on CD20, which are physically close to each other as a result of a disulfide bond between amino acids 167 and 183.

History 
Rituximab was developed by IDEC Pharmaceuticals under the name IDEC-C2B8. The U.S. patent for the drug was issued in 1998 and expired in 2015.

Based on its safety and effectiveness in clinical trials, rituximab was approved by the U.S. Food and Drug Administration in 1997 to treat B-cell non-Hodgkin lymphomas resistant to other chemotherapy regimens. Rituximab, in combination with CHOP chemotherapy, is superior to CHOP alone in the treatment of diffuse large B-cell lymphoma and many other B-cell lymphomas. In 2010, it was approved by the European Commission for maintenance treatment after initial treatment of follicular lymphoma.

It is on the World Health Organization's List of Essential Medicines.

In 2014, Genentech reclassified rituxan as a specialty drug, a class of drugs that are only available through specialty distributors in the US. Because wholesalers discounts and rebates no longer apply, hospitals would pay more.

Originally available for intravenous injection (e.g. over 2.5 hrs), in 2016, it gained EU approval in a formulation for subcutaneous injection for B-cell CLL/lymphoma (CLL).

Society and culture

Economics 
Patents on the drug expired in Europe in February 2013, and in the US in September 2016. , several biosimilars had been approved in the US, India, the European Union, Switzerland, Japan and Australia. The US FDA approved Truxima (rituximab-abbs) in 2018, Ruxience (rituximab-pvvr) in 2019 and Riabni (rituximab-arrx) in 2020. The latter is about $3600 per 500 mg, wholesale, list.

Research

Chronic fatigue syndrome
Rituximab did not improve symptoms in patients with chronic fatigue syndrome in a trial published in 2019. 22% of participants had serious events. This potential use was investigated after improvements in chronic fatigue syndrome was seen in two cancer patients treated with rituximab.

Intrathecal

For CNS diseases, rituximab could be administered intrathecally and this possibility is under study.

Other anti-CD20 monoclonals 

The efficacy and success of rituximab has led to some other anti-CD20 monoclonal antibodies being developed:

 ocrelizumab, humanized (90%-95% human) B cell-depleting agent.
 ofatumumab (HuMax-CD20) a fully human B cell-depleting agent.
 Third-generation anti-CD20s such as obinutuzumab have a glycoengineered Fc fragment (Fc) with enhanced binding to Fc gamma receptors, which increase ADCC (antibody-dependent cellular cytotoxicity). This strategy for enhancing a monoclonal antibody's ability to induce ADCC takes advantage of the fact that the displayed Fc glycan controls the antibody's affinity for Fc receptors.

References

External links 
 
 

Genentech brands
Hoffmann-La Roche brands
Monoclonal antibodies for tumors
Orphan drugs
Specialty drugs
World Health Organization essential medicines
Wikipedia medicine articles ready to translate